Eribolus is a genus of frit flies in the family Chloropidae. There are at least 4 described species in Eribolus.

Species
 Eribolus californicus Sabrosky, 1950
 Eribolus longulus (Loew, 1863)
 Eribolus nana (Zetterstedt, 1838)
 Eribolus nearacticus (Sabrosky, 1948)

References

Further reading

External links

 Diptera.info

Oscinellinae